Archduchess Maria Antonietta of Austria, Princess of Tuscany (Maria Antonietta Leopolda Annunziata Anna Amalia Giuseppa Giovanna Immacolata Tecla; 10 January 1858 – 13 April 1883) was a member of the House of Habsburg-Lorraine. She served as the Princess-Abbess of the Theresian Royal and Imperial Convent in Hradčany from 1881 until her death in 1883.

Biography 
Archduchess Maria Antonietta was born on 10 January 1858 in Florence as the first child of Ferdinand, Hereditary Grand Duke of Tuscany and the only child from his first marriage to Princess Anna of Saxony. Her maternal grandparents were King John of Saxony and Princess Amalie Auguste of Bavaria, a daughter of King Maximilian I Joseph of Bavaria. Her mother died in 1859. Later that year her father succeeded her grandfather, Leopold II, as the Grand Duke of Tuscany. In 1860 the Grand Duchy of Tuscany was annexed into the Kingdom of Sardinia. After the annexation her family moved to Salzburg. In 1868 her father married Princess Alice of Bourbon-Parma.

In 1881 Maria Antonietta was appointed by Franz Joseph I of Austria to serve as the Princess-Abbess of the Imperial and Royal Theresian Institution of Noble Ladies in Hradčany. She was also a 1st class Dame of the Order of the Starry Cross.

She was a writer, and published works in German under the pseudonym Arno.

In November 1882 she moved to Cannes in search of a better climate for her declining health, taking up residence in the Villa Félicie. She died in Cannes on 13 April 1883 unmarried and without issue.

References 

1858 births
1883 deaths
19th-century Italian women writers
Maria Antonia
Italian princesses
Italian Roman Catholic abbesses
Maria Antonia
Nobility from Florence
Burials at the Imperial Crypt
Daughters of monarchs